The women's triathlon was part of the Triathlon at the 2018 Asian Games program, was held in JSC Lake Jakabaring on 31 August 2018. The race was held over the "international distance" and consisted of  swimming,  road bicycle racing, and  road running.

Japanese triathlete Yuko Takahashi clinched the gold medal with a time of 1:59:29. Zhong Mengying from China and Hoi Long from Macau captured the silver and bronze medal respectively.

Schedule
All times are Western Indonesia Time (UTC+07:00)

Results 
Legend
DNF — Did not finish

References

External links
 Results

Triathlon at the 2018 Asian Games